John Gordon Smith (1863 – 19 June 1921) was a member of the Queensland Legislative Council.

Smith was born at Rhynie, Aberdeenshire, Scotland, to William Smith and his wife Christina (née Duncan). He was a publican in Maryborough and the proprietor of a night coffee stall in Queen Street, Brisbane, in 1900. Smith was President of the British Associated Friendly Societies Dispensary as well as a Past Grand Master of the Ancient Order of Foresters.

Political career
When the Labour Party starting forming governments in Queensland, it found much of its legislation being blocked by a hostile Council, where members had been appointed for life by successive conservative governments. After a failed referendum in May 1917, Premier Ryan tried a new tactic, and later that year advised the Governor, Sir Hamilton John Goold-Adams, to appoint thirteen new members whose allegiance lay with Labour to the Council.

In 1920, the new Premier Ted Theodore appointed a further fourteen new members to the Council with Smith amongst the appointees. He served until his death in June the next year.

Personal life
On 11 January 1884, Smith married Annie Coles and together had one son and four daughters. He died in Brisbane in June 1921 and was buried at Toowong Cemetery.

References

Members of the Queensland Legislative Council
1863 births
1921 deaths
Australian Labor Party members of the Parliament of Queensland
Burials at Toowong Cemetery
People from Aberdeenshire